Amundsen Land or Amundsenland, is a peninsula in central North Greenland. It is a part of the Northeast Greenland National Park.

The territory was named after Norwegian explorer Roald Amundsen (1872 – 1928).

Geography
Amundsen Land is located in western Peary Land, to the south of Roosevelt Land, separated from it by the Harder Fjord and the Dreng Glacier (Dreng Brae) at its head. To the west it is limited by the Weyprecht Fjord, and to the south by the O.B. Bøggild Fjord and the Nordpasset, beyond which lies the Hans Tausen Ice Cap. The westernmost headland is Cape Holger Danske.

Amundsen Land is mountainous with many glaciated areas. The highest point is a  summit in the central part of the peninsula.

Bibliography
H.P. Trettin (ed.), Geology of the Innuitian Orogen and Arctic Platform of Canada and Greenland. 1991

See also
Innuitian orogeny

References

External links 
Base-metal and REE anomalies in lower Palaeozoic sedimentary rocks of Amundsen Land, central North Greenland: implications for Zn-Pb potential
Cambrian - Lower Silurian slope and basin stratigraphy between northern Nyeboe Land and western Amundsen Land, North Greenland
The Earliest Annelids: Lower Cambrian Polychaetes from the Sirius Passet Lagerstätte, Peary Land, North Greenland
Peninsulas of Greenland
Peary Land